David De Senna Fernandes Sualehe (born 23 March 1997) is a Portuguese footballer who plays for Olimpija Ljubljana as a defender.

Career
Born in Porto and of Mozambican descent, Sualehe was on the books of several clubs as a youth, including Sporting CP and Belenenses in Lisbon, and FC Porto and Boavista in his hometown. He took part with Porto under-19 in the UEFA Youth League in 2015–16.

In July 2016, Sualehe ended his three-year spell at Porto by signing a five-year contract at Sporting with a release clause of €45 million. On 6 August, he made his professional debut with Sporting B in a 2016–17 LigaPro match against Portimonense, playing the first 73 minutes of a 2–1 home loss before being substituted for Bubacar Djaló.

On 30 August 2018, Sualehe signed a three-year deal at Vitória de Guimarães, being again assigned to the reserve team in the second tier. A year later, after relegation, he was loaned to Farense in the same league.

Sualehe moved to Primeira Liga club Paços de Ferreira on 1 September 2020, having contributed to Farense's promotion to the top flight. Nearly exactly a year later, having not played any games for the Castores, he was loaned to second-tier Académica de Coimbra.

On 12 July 2022, Sualehe left Portugal for the first time in his career, signing a two-year deal with the option of a third at Olimpija Ljubljana in the Slovenian PrvaLiga.

Personal life
In January 2022, Sualehe's €100,000 Mercedes-Benz E-Class was stolen in Coimbra. It was found by the National Republican Guard in Vila das Aves, abandoned.

References

External links

Stats and profile at LPFP 
National team data 

1997 births
Living people
Portuguese people of Mozambican descent
Footballers from Porto
Portuguese footballers
Association football fullbacks
Portugal youth international footballers
Odivelas F.C. players
Sporting CP footballers
Sporting CP B players
Boavista F.C. players
FC Porto players
FC Porto B players
Vitória S.C. B players
S.C. Farense players
F.C. Paços de Ferreira players
Associação Académica de Coimbra – O.A.F. players
NK Olimpija Ljubljana (2005) players
Liga Portugal 2 players
Slovenian PrvaLiga players
Portuguese expatriate footballers
Portuguese expatriate sportspeople in Slovenia
Expatriate footballers in Slovenia